Iturri is a Basque surname. Notable people with the surname include:

Carlos Iturri (1917–1999), Peruvian fencer
Simón Iturri Patiño (1862–1947), Bolivian industrialist 
It is also "fountain" in Basque and a street in Bilbao

Basque-language surnames